Michèle Edith A'Court  (born 1961) is a New Zealand comedian, writer and feminist. She has toured New Zealand and international venues with her standup comedy shows and in 2010 was awarded the Female Comedian of the Decade at the NZ Comedy Guild Awards. A'Court has appeared in many TV shows since the late 1980s including What Now, 7Days and The Project. She is a regular columnist with The Spinoff and the author of two books. She was appointed an Officer of the New Zealand Order of Merit, for services to the entertainment and comedy industries, in the 2023 New Year Honours.

Biography 
A'Court trained in journalism, and has a degree in English literature and drama from Victoria University of Wellington. In the mid-1980s she worked as a TVNZ publicist. She then got a job as a host on children's television show What Now starting in 1987. She saw comedy as a vehicle for social activism as a feminist as well as making people feel 'better about life'. When she was young was inspired by the comedy of Danny Kaye and Carol Burnett.  When she started doing stand-up comedy in the 1990s there were very few women. A'Court acknowledged in 2022 the fight for women to get a fairer representation as performers was continuing and also recognised that now comedy billing that used to be often one women per show are now often a 50:50 ratio. In stand-up A'Court has toured New Zealand and performed around the world including Las Vegas, Edinburgh, and Vancouver.  A'Court supported the comedy industry of New Zealand by establishing the New Zealand Comedy Guild and she was the chairperson from 1999 to 2006.

Since 2009 A'Court regularly appears on the comedy TV show 7Days and since 2018 has been a regular host on the current affairs programme The Project (both on the New Zealand Three TV channel). Some recent stand-up comedy performances include headlining Mt Eden Comedy with Michele A'Court in 2015, and Friday Laughs in 2022 alongside her husband, comedian Jeremy Elwood.

A'Court has written two books. Her first book, Stuff I Forgot To Tell My Daughter (2015), was based on her stand-up comedy show of the same name. A'Court has written guest columns for Stuff and is a guest writer for The Spinoff.

Books 

 Stuff I Forgot To Tell My Daughter (2015)
 How We Met (2018)
 Foreword – Funny As: The Story of New Zealand Comedy

Selected screenography 

 L&P Top Town (1986) Final
 What Now? (1987–1988), Presenter, Writer – Television
 Choice Not Chance (1992), Presenter – Short Film
 Pulp Comedy (1995–2003), Subject – Television
 Comedy Central (1995–1997), As: Various roles – Television
 Newsflash (1998), Writer – Television
 A Kiwi Christmas (1998), Narrator – Television
 Teen Sex (2005), Narrator – Television
 Breakfast (2006–2008), Presenter – Television
 Shortland Street (2008–2009), Writer, As: Helen Carson – Television
 7 Days (2009) – ongoing, Subject – Television
 Staines Down Drains – Fool's Gold (2011), Writer, As: Mary–Jane Staines, Herk and Beanz – Television
 A Night at the Classic (2012), As: Michele – Television
 Go Girls (2013), As: Miriam Hirsch – Television
 Funny As: The Story of New Zealand Comedy (2019), Subject – Television
 The Project (2018) – ongoing, Presenter – Television
 On the Rag (2019–2022), Presenter – Web

Awards and nominations 

 Special Recognition Award for Excellence in Presentation (1991): Choice Not Chance ITVA Awards (New Zealand arm of the International Television Association)
 Female Comedian of the Decade (2010) New Zealand Comedy Awards (NZ Comedy Guild)
 VAC Reilly Award for Excellence in Comedy (2015)
 Nominated – Best Presenter: Entertainment (2020) (with Leonie Hayden and Alex Casey): On the Rag  New Zealand Television Awards
 Appointed Officer of the New Zealand Order of Merit in the 2023 New Year Honours, for services to the entertainment and comedy industries

Personal life 
A'Court lives in Auckland and is married to comedian Jeremy Elwood.

References 

1961 births
Living people
New Zealand entertainers
21st-century New Zealand writers
21st-century New Zealand women writers
21st-century New Zealand non-fiction writers
Officers of the New Zealand Order of Merit
New Zealand women comedians
New Zealand comedians
New Zealand stand-up comedians
Victoria University of Wellington alumni